Bohdan Hladun (born 10 June 1999) is a professional Ukrainian football striker who currently plays for the Ukrainian Premier League club Volyn Lutsk.

Career
Hladun is a product of the FC Volyn Sportive youth school system from age 6. His first trainer was Valeriy Nazaruk. He made his debut for FC Volyn Lutsk played as a substituted player in the game against FC Vorskla Poltava on 10 December 2016 in the Ukrainian Premier League.

References

External links 

Ukrainian footballers
Ukrainian Premier League players
FC Volyn Lutsk players
Association football forwards
1999 births
Living people